The Soleil-Royal was a ship in the French Navy, the third ship of that name. She was the first 80-gun two-decker to use the 24-pounder long gun on her second battery, giving her a considerable firepower for the time and allowing her to challenge three-deckers. Her name Soleil-Royal, honouring the French crown and usually reserved for the largest units of the Navy, testifies of the change of focus from large three-deckers onto strong two-deckers.

She was Brienne's flagship at the battle of Quiberon Bay, where she ran aground and was burnt to prevent her capture. Her cannons were recovered by the Royal Navy and transported to Plymouth for reuse in British vessels.

Sources and references

Bibliography

External links
 

Ships of the line of the French Navy
1749 ships
Maritime incidents in 1759